Worldvision Enterprises, Inc. was an American television program and home video distributor established in 1954 as ABC Film Syndication, the domestic and overseas program distribution arm of the ABC Television Network. They primarily licensed programs from independent producers, rather than producing their own content.

History

ABC Films Syndication 
In spring 1954, American Broadcasting-Paramount Theatres, Inc. created ABC Films Syndication, Inc. (AFS), or ABC Films, a subsidiary headed by George Shupert, which specialized in syndication and in-house program production. By , AFS formed a 50/50 joint venture production company, Rabco Productions, with Hal Roach Jr.

In , AFS announced an expansion in production and sales staff for the year. Five new properties were acquired by the company and all received pilots, with two set for syndication if not placed nationally. Two were to be produced by John Gibbs and Meridian Pictures, Renfrew of the Mounted and Ripley's Believe It or Not!, while Rabco's Bernard Fox was assigned with Forest Ranger. The two pilots set for production were The Americano, directed by Martin Gosch and filmed in Spain, and The Force produced by Victor Stoloff about the plain clothed Canadian Mounties division. Two shows, Code 3 and The Three Musketeers were already under production for syndication. One of AFS's earliest successes was Sheena, Queen of the Jungle, produced largely in Mexico by Nassour Studios and starring Irish McCalla as the comic-book heroine. Even though only 26 episodes were filmed, the series ran for years in reruns on local stations, in kiddie-show time slots.

In 1959, ABC International created Worldvision Enterprises to syndicate programs for overseas markets. Henry G. Plitt, previously president of Paramount Gulf Theatres, became president of the company in February 1959, replacing Shupert after he left for Metro-Goldwyn-Mayer. Kevin O’Sullivan later became president of the company.

Worldvision Enterprises 
In 1971, the FCC barred the participation of networks in the syndication of their own programs, though this rule was eliminated by 1993. Worldvision Enterprises was formed by five former ABC Films executives to purchase the network's syndication assets on March 30, 1973. In 1974, Charles Fries and his Alpine Productions company had struck a distribution contract with the studio.

Worldvision had obtained good relations from the Big Three networks who produced it, notably NBC, who produced Little House on the Prairie, and CBS, who produced Spencer's Pilots, which Worldvision distributed for international syndication.

On November 7, 1981, Worldvision launched a home video subsidiary Worldvision Home Video, Inc., which was enabled to distribute its own videocassette titles, most notably its Hanna-Barbera cartoon product, the Jack Nicklaus' Golf My Way instructional video series, as well as the QM Productions library, with Albert Hartigan headed executive vice president and Martin Weinstein as the sales manager of the company. 

Worldvision has been owned by many companies over the years. The growth of its home video division was primarily under the ownership of Taft Broadcasting, which acquired the company in 1979. The sale was first announced in November 1978. As a result of Taft's purchase of Worldvision, Taft merged its syndicated arms Taft H-B Program Sales and Taft H-B International into the company. In 1981, Worldvision launched subsidiary Evergreen Programs to generate sales of its own programming already aired by networks and stations. In October 1987, Taft's assets including Worldvision were acquired by Great American Communications.

Television producer Aaron Spelling, attempting to find an outlet to distribute his programs, attempted to buy Worldvision from Great American, but chief company shareholder Carl H. Lindner told Spelling that he was not interested in selling the company. Lindner did agree to sell Worldvision to Spelling Productions for 50% of Spelling, Inc., the combined company, in 1988. The merger was finalized on March 1, 1989.

In 1994, Worldvision's home video division was folded into Republic Pictures's Home Video division after Spelling Entertainment's purchase of Republic in the same year. Also that same year, Blockbuster Inc., operator of the now-defunct video store chain, briefly held a controlling interest in Spelling, and its logo appeared on programs alongside Worldvision's.

When Spelling Entertainment Group merged with Viacom on May 26, 1999, Worldvision's operations were folded into Paramount Domestic Television, then given over to CBS Corporation at the start of 2006 when Viacom and CBS were split into different companies.

On December 4, 2019, CBS Corporation and Viacom remerged into a single entity as ViacomCBS (and eventually renamed into Paramount Global), which currently distributes the Worldvision library through CBS Media Ventures.

Legal issues with World Vision International 
The company's logo, as it appeared at the end of the programs it distributed, carried the following disclaimer: "Not Affiliated with World Vision International, a Religious and Charitable Organization." This was because, in the mid-1970s, the charity sued the company for its use of the "Worldvision" name, which eventually led to trademark infringement (a similar issue has existed for decades between Burlington Coat Factory and Burlington Industries, both independently and as a brand asset). They eventually settled, with Worldvision allowed to continue using the name for the syndication company, provided that a disclaimer was included to distance itself from World Vision International, which was implemented starting in 1974.

References 

American Broadcasting Company
American companies established in 1954
American companies disestablished in 1999
Mass media companies established in 1954
Mass media companies disestablished in 1999
Television syndication distributors
CBS Media Ventures
Taft Broadcasting
Defunct mass media companies of the United States
1954 establishments in New York (state)
1999 disestablishments in California
Paramount Global subsidiaries
1979 mergers and acquisitions
1987 mergers and acquisitions
1989 mergers and acquisitions
1999 mergers and acquisitions